Geronimo is a 1962 American Western film made by Levy-Gardner-Laven and released by United Artists, starring Chuck Connors in the title role.  The film was directed by Arnold Laven from a screenplay by Pat Fielder, filming took place in Sierra de Órganos National Park in the town of Sombrerete, Mexico.

The following year, Connors married his costar, Kamala Devi.

Summary
The movie loosely follows the events leading up to the final surrender of Geronimo during the Apache-United States Wars in 1886.

Cast
 Chuck Connors as Geronimo
 Kamala Devi as Teela
 Pat Conway as Captain William Maynard
 Armando Silvestre as Natchez
 Adam West as Lieutenant John Delahay 
 Lawrence Dobkin as General George A. Crook
 Ross Martin as Mangas
 Denver Pyle as Senator Conrad
 Eduardo Noriega as  Colonel Morales  
 John Anderson as Jeremiah Burns
 Enid Jaynes as Huera
Mario Navarro as Giantah
 Nancy Rodman as Mrs. Marsh 
 Amanda Ames as Mrs. Burns
 Claudio Brook as Mr. Henry

Production
In November 1957 the producing team of Arnold Laven, Arthur Gardner and Jules V. Levy announced they would make a film about Geronimo for their company, Gramercy Pictures, and release through United Artists. They hoped for Linda Darnell to play the female lead.

Following the completion of the film in 1961, the producers signed Connors to a two-picture contract.

Reception
The film grossed $300,000 in Japan alone.

See also
 List of American films of 1962

References

External links
 
 
 

1962 films
1960s English-language films
1962 Western (genre) films
American Western (genre) films
Apache Wars films
Films about Native Americans
Cultural depictions of Geronimo
Films set in the 1880s
United Artists films
Films directed by Arnold Laven
Films scored by Hugo Friedhofer
Films shot in Mexico
1960s historical films
1960s American films